Jacques Coitier (c. 1430 – 22 October 1506) was a French doctor. He was chief physician to Louis XI of France and president of the Chambre des comptes.

Coitier was born at Poligny, Franche-Comté.  His name is spelled in several ways, most often Coictier (the spelling used by Victor Hugo in his novel The Hunchback of Notre-Dame), but also Coittier, Cotier, Coytier or Coctier. An analysis of his signatures by Achille Chereau has allowed Coitier to become the standard spelling - this was the name cited most often in medical annals.  He died in Paris.

Bibliography
 Mémoires de Philippe de Commines in Mémoires pour servir à l'histoire de France, Michaud et Poujalat, Paris, 1837
 Nouvelle Biographie Générale, t11, Firmin Didot, 1855, pp. 86–89
 Masson et Asselin, Dictionnaire Encyclopédique des Sciences Médicales, t. 18, 1876, pp. 717–718
 Bulletin de la Société française d'histoire de la médecine, n°11, 1912, pp. 315–322
 Émile Aron, Louis XI et ses guérisseurs, CLD, 1983
 Victor Advielle, Discussion historique sur le véritable lieu de naissance de Jacques Coitier, médecin du roi Louis XI, H. Damelet, 1865
 Achille Chéreau, Jacques Coitier, médecin de Louis XI, roi de France, Mareschal, 1861

References

1430s births
1506 deaths
15th-century French people
People from Jura (department)
French surgeons
15th-century French physicians